Helvijs Lūsis (born 14 January 1987) is a Latvian bobsledder, brakeman who has competed since 2010.

So far his highest achievements include a bronze medal at the four-man 2011–12 Bobsleigh World Cup race in Winterberg as well as 2012 World Junior Championship title at the four-man event.

Before becoming a bobsledder, Lūsis was a sprinter, winning a bronze medal at the 4x100 relay at the 2008 Latvian Athletics Championships.

References
Helvijs Lūsis profile at the FIBT homepage

External links

 
 
 
 

1987 births
Latvian male bobsledders
Living people
Bobsledders at the 2014 Winter Olympics
Bobsledders at the 2018 Winter Olympics
Olympic bobsledders of Latvia